This list contains various lists of state leaders, defined as heads of state and/or heads of government. Typically this list includes presidents, prime ministers or monarchs.

List of current heads of state and government
Lists of state leaders by century
List of current state leaders by date of assumption of office
Lists of office-holders
List of elected and appointed female heads of state and government
List of longest-reigning monarchs
Lists of state leaders by age
List of oldest living state leaders
List of openly LGBT heads of state and government
List of heads of state by diplomatic precedence
List of heads of state and government who died in office
List of heads of state or government who have been in exile
List of heads of state and government who died in aviation accidents and incidents
List of heads of state educated in the United States
List of former heads of regimes who were sentenced to death
List of heads of government who were later imprisoned
List of heads of state and government Nobel laureates
List of heads of state and government deposed by foreign power in the 20th and 21st century
List of heads of state and government who committed suicide

Heads of government